The Scapegoat is a 1959 British mystery film based on the 1957 novel of the same name by Daphne du Maurier, and starring Alec Guinness, Nicole Maurey and Bette Davis.

Plot
John Barratt (Alec Guinness), a lonely, discontented teacher of French at a British university, is on holiday in France. There, by chance, he meets his double, French nobleman Jacques De Gué (Guinness again). They become acquainted. Barratt becomes drunk and accepts De Gué's invitation to share his hotel room. When he wakes up the next morning, Barratt finds himself alone in the room, with his clothes and passport missing. De Gué's chauffeur Gaston shows up to take his master home, and Barratt is unable to convince him that he is not the nobleman. Gaston calls Dr. Aloin, who diagnoses the Englishman as suffering from schizophrenia.

A bewildered Barratt allows himself to be taken to De Gué's chateau, where he meets "his" family: daughter Marie-Noel, wife Françoise, sister Blanche and formidable mother the Countess. None of them believe his story - it appears that De Gué is a malicious liar - so Barratt resigns himself to playing along. As time goes on, he feels needed, something missing in his sterile prior life.

The next day, brother-in-law Aristide discusses business with him. Later, in the nearby town, Barratt is nearly run down by De Gué's mistress, Béla, on her horse. He spends the usual Wednesday afternoon tryst getting acquainted with her. The next time they meet, before he can confess the truth, she informs him that she has already guessed it.

Barratt delves into the neglected family glass-making business. He decides to renew a contract with the local foundry, even on unfavourable terms, to avoid throwing the longtime employees out of work. The Countess is upset by his decision and mentions a marriage contract. When Barratt investigates, he learns that Françoise's considerable wealth, tied up by her businessman father, would come under his control if she were to die. Françoise finds him reading the contract and becomes very upset, accusing him of wanting to see her dead. Barratt consoles her by telling her that the contract can be changed. He begins to suspect the reason for De Gué's disappearance.

One day, Barratt receives a message from Béla. He goes to see her and spends a pleasant afternoon with her, though she denies having sent for him. When he returns to the chateau, he learns that Françoise has died from a fall. Blanche accuses Barratt of murder, stating that she overheard him with his wife in her room just before her death. However, Gaston provides an unshakable alibi, having driven Barratt to his rendezvous with Béla.

Barratt is not surprised when De Gué resurfaces shortly afterward. They meet in private; the Frenchman demands his identity back, but Barratt refuses. Both men have come armed and shots are exchanged. Barratt emerges victorious and returns to his new life and Béla.

Cast

 Alec Guinness as John Barratt / Jacques De Gué  
 Bette Davis as Countess De Gué    
 Nicole Maurey as Béla  
 Irene Worth as Françoise  
 Pamela Brown as Blanche  
 Annabel Bartlett as Marie-Noel  
 Geoffrey Keen as Gaston  
 Noel Howlett as Dr. Aloin  
 Peter Bull as Aristide  
 Leslie French as Lacoste  
 Alan Webb as Inspector  
 Maria Britneva as Maid  
 Eddie Byrne as Barman  
 Alexander Archdale as Gamekeeper  
 Peter Sallis as Customs Official
 Sam Kydd Uncredited

Production
According to Robert Osborne of Turner Classic Movies, the original choice for Barratt / De Gué was Cary Grant, but Daphne du Maurier insisted on Guinness because he reminded her of her father, actor Gerald du Maurier.
Later though, she regretted her choice, blaming Guinness for the film’s box-office failure, a production that du Maurier herself had partially financed.

Osborne also states that Guinness handled the directing chores when Hamer was drunk.

Box office
According to MGM records, the film earned $570,000 in the U.S. and Canada and $625,000 elsewhere resulting in a loss of $382,000.

See also
 List of British films of 1959

References

External links
 
 
 
 
 

1959 films
1959 crime films
1950s British films
1950s English-language films
1950s mystery films
British mystery films
British black-and-white films
Films based on British novels
Films based on works by Daphne du Maurier
Films directed by Robert Hamer
Films with screenplays by Gore Vidal
Metro-Goldwyn-Mayer films
Films produced by Michael Balcon
Films scored by Bronisław Kaper